Saint-Girons is the name or part of the name of several communes in France:
 Saint-Girons, Ariège, in the Ariège department
 Saint-Girons-d'Aiguevives, in the Gironde department
 Saint-Girons-en-Béarn (formerly Saint-Girons), in the Pyrénées-Atlantiques department
 Vielle-Saint-Girons, in the Landes department